Hernando de Alarcón (born  1500) was a Spanish explorer and navigator of the 16th century, noted for having led an early expedition to the Baja California Peninsula, during which he became one of the first Europeans to ascend the Colorado River from its mouth and perhaps the first to reach Alta California.

Little is known about Alarcón's life outside of his exploits in New Spain. He was probably born in the town of Trujillo, in present-day Extremadura, Spain, in the first years of the 16th century and traveled to the Spanish colonies in the Americas as a young man.

1540 expedition
By 1540, Mexico had been conquered and state-sponsored expeditions were being sent north in search of new wealth and the existence of a water passage between the Atlantic and Pacific oceans. Viceroy of New Spain Antonio de Mendoza commissioned Francisco Vázquez de Coronado to undertake a massive overland expedition with the purpose of finding the Seven Cities of Cibola, which were rumoured to exist in the unexplored northern interior. The expedition was to be resupplied with stores and provisions delivered by ships travelling up the Sea of Cortés, the commander of which would be Alarcón.

Alarcón set sail from Acapulco with two ships, the San Pedro and the Santa Catalina, on May 9, 1540, and was later joined by the San Gabriel at St. Jago de Buena Esperanza, in Colima. His orders from Mendoza were to await the arrival of Coronado's land expedition at a certain latitude along the coast. The meeting with Coronado was never effected, though Alarcón reached the appointed place and left letters, which were soon afterwards discovered by Melchor Díaz, another explorer.

Alarcón eventually sailed to the northern terminus of the Gulf of California and completed the explorations begun by Francisco de Ulloa the preceding year. During this voyage Alarcón proved to his satisfaction that no open-water passage existed between the Gulf of California and the South Sea. Subsequently, on September 26, he entered the mouth of the Colorado River, which he named the Buena Guía ("good guide"). He was the first European to ascend the river for a distance considerable enough to make important observations. On a second voyage, he probably proceeded past the present-day site of Yuma, Arizona. A map drawn by one of Alarcón's pilots is the earliest accurately detailed representation of the Gulf of California and the lower course of the Colorado River.

Alarcón is almost unique among 16th-century conquistadores in that he reportedly treated the Indians he met humanely, as opposed to the often reckless and cruel behaviour known from accounts of his contemporaries. Bernard de Voto, in his 1953 Westward the Course of Empire, observed: "The Indians had an experience they were never to repeat: they were sorry to see these white men leave." Alarcón wrote of his contact with the Yuma-speaking Indians along Colorado. The information he compiled consisted of their practices in warfare, religion, curing and even sexual customs.

California Historical Landmark No. 568, on the west bank of the Colorado River near Andrade in Imperial County, California, commemorates Alarcón's expedition had been the first non-Indians to sight land within the present-day state of California.

California Historical Landmark
California Historical Landmark number 568 reads:

NO. 568 HERNANDO DE ALARCÓN EXPEDITION - Alarcón's mission was to provide supplies for Francisco Coronado's expedition in search of the fabled Seven Cities of Cibola. The Spaniards led by Hernando de Alarcón ascended the Colorado River by boat from the Gulf of California past this point, thereby becoming the first non-Indians to sight Alta California on September 5, 1540.

See also
California Historical Landmarks in Imperial County
 Spanish missions in Arizona
Spanish missions in the Sonoran Desert
Spanish missions in Baja California
California Historical Landmark

References

Further reading

 Hammond, George P. & al., ed. Narratives of the Coronado Expedition, 1540-1542. University of New Mexico Press: Albuquerque, New Mexico. 1940.

External links
 The Pirate King's Bio of Hernando de Alarcón
 

16th-century Spanish people
Spanish navigators
Explorers of Mexico
Explorers of the United States
Spanish explorers of North America
History of Baja California